1AD may refer to:
The year 1 AD
First Assistant Director, a role in film industry
1st Armored Division (United States), an armored division of the United States Army

See also
1 (disambiguation)
AD (disambiguation)